Warwick Students' Union, also known as Warwick SU, is the students' union for the University of Warwick, in Coventry, England.

History
The Students' Union developed in tandem with the University and has existed since 1965. In its first few decades, it was heavily involved with the protests, rent strikes, and occupations which earned the University the nickname of 'Red Warwick’. In 1974, one Warwick student Kevin Gately was killed during the Red Lion Square disorders. More recently, in 2009, many Students' Union officers were active in the occupation of a lecture theatre in the Social Studies (S0.21) building to express solidarity with Gaza.

One of its on-campus successes was its campaign for its own building, which finally succeeded in 1975 after lengthy opposition from large parts of the University establishment. Some of its early activism was carried out in partnership with sympathetic elements of the academic staff of the university, with one incident being chronicled in the book Warwick University Ltd., edited by the eminent historian E. P. Thompson.

The Union is also a shareholder in the NUS Services Ltd (NUSSL).

Recent history 

Warwick Occupy

On Tuesday 19 November 2019, a collective of students known as Warwick Occupy led an occupation of three rooms in Warwick SUHQ for 30 days to protest allegations of institutional racism within Warwick SU. The collective were made up of several liberation groups and societies on campus including Warwick Anti-Racism Society, Warwick Anti-Sexism society, Warwick Pride and Warwick Labour.

The initial protests that sparked the occupation began when retired Israeli Defense Force Colonel Eyal Dror was invited by the Warwick Jewish Israeli Society and Stand With Us UK to speak on campus. The event took place on 19 November, less than a week after at least 32 Palestinians were killed in Israeli air raids in Gaza led by the Israel Defence Force. A statement with more than 250 signatures had called for the cancellation of the event. During the colonel's talk, protestors linked arms and the protest eventually culminated in the occupation of three rooms in the SU headquarters.

Free education

In the Autumn of 2011, Warwick Students' Union passed policy against tuition fees which stated its position in defence of free education.

In October 2014, a campaign group emerged, called Warwick for Free Education. The group rose to prominence after a sit-in at the University's Senate House was broken up by the police, who had been called in to deal with an assault of a university staff member. The police were accused of using excessive force, and video footage appears to a show a police officer using CS spray on students. This led to an investigation by the Independent Police Complaints Commission. In July 2015, one protester was found guilty of common assault, while another was found guilty of causing fear and provoking violence.

In response to his handling of the situation and other issues, Warwick Students' Union passed a Vote of No Confidence against Nigel Thrift, Vice-Chancellor of the University.  A two-hour panel debate was held on the student protests, at which Thrift faced further criticism for calling students yobs.  University Registrar, Ken Sloan, said that Thrift's response was "very human" claiming that Thrift had been victim to a student campaign of targeted intimidation, and had been verbally abused and spat at near his home. The Warwick for Free Education Campaign group denied any association with such attacks but claimed they "further highlight the widespread dissatisfaction and anger towards Nigel Thrift and his behaviour as VC".

Fossil fuel divestment

On 8 July 2015, the university committed to divesting from fossil fuels, and placing its investments elsewhere when an opportunity becomes available. This came in the wake of a successful student campaign, and union referendum at which 65% of voters supported divestment. At the time of the decision, the university held no direct investments in any of the 200 largest fossil fuel companies, but did hold indirect investments, which it pledged to eliminate.

Students' Union building

The Union consists of Union South (largely food, drink and entertainment) and Union North (mostly administration, offices and meeting rooms).

The Students' Union got its first building, Union South, in 1975, after a long struggle with the University under Vice-Chancellor Jack Butterworth, who said to Will Fitzgerald (President of the Union in 1970-1): "the Students' Union will never have its own building."  Union North was added in the 1990s and, until recently, was linked to Union South by the 'link corridor.'

Union South rebuild

The Union South building underwent a £11 million refurbishment in spring 2008, which was completed in January 2010. The new facilities included a club and gig venue, The Copper Rooms, a pub, The Dirty Duck, a sandwich bar, The Bread Oven, a drinks bar, The Terrace Bar, a tea room, Curiositea, branches of Santander and Barclays banks, a pharmacy, a travel agent, spaces for societies and a pool room.

Union companies
The Union has four subsidiary companies:

 Student Union Services Warwick Limited (Registered company number: 02197761)
 Membership Solutions Limited (Registered company number: 05525449)
 Warwick Students Union Services Limited, (Registered company number: 01187495) (mostly dormant and retained due to contracts held in its name)
 Students' Union Warwick Events Limited (Registered company number: 06371766)

In the style of the University of Warwick itself, the Union has an entrepreneurial strategy. Unlike many other British universities, which have privatised halls of accommodation and catering facilities, Warwick provides all of these in-house through its many subsidiaries. With Warwick SU, the entrepreneurial strategy is manifest through Membership Solutions Limited, an IT company that currently provides website and other solutions for membership organisations across the UK.

Union Awards

Societies Awards

Student Voice and Impact Awards 
The Student Voice and Impact Awards recognise and celebrate students who advocate and create change for the student experience, including Course Reps, Execs, Activists & Campaigners.

Notable people
 Lord Kerslake, former Head of the Home Civil Service, served as General Secretary from 1977 to 1998.
 The Conservative MP David Davis stood for the position of President during his attendance at Warwick, but failed to win. He also founded Radio Warwick, the student radio station.
 Claire Horton, served as Chief Executive from 2002 to 2008.

References

Warwick
Students' Union